James Murle Cork (July 9, 1894, Yale, Michigan – November 27, 1957, Ann Arbor, Michigan) was an American physicist, known for his research in nuclear physics and nuclear spectroscopy.

Biography
He graduated in 1911 from Yale High School in Yale, Michigan. At the University of Michigan, he graduated in 1916 with a B.S., in 1917 with an M.S., and in 1922 with a Ph.D. From 1917 to 1918 he was a first lieutenant in the U.S. Army Signal Corps. He was from 1917 to 1919 an assistant physicist at the Bureau of Standards in Washington, D.C. and from 1919 to 1920 an assistant professor at Pennsylvania State College. In the department of physics of the University of Michigan he was from 1920 to 1922 an instructor, from 1922 to 1937 an associate professor, and from 1937 until his death in 1957 a full professor.

After the attack on Pearl Harbor, Cork was from 1942 to 1946 a section member and research supervisor of the National Defense Research Committee (NDRC). He gained an international reputation for his research in nuclear physics and radioactivity. He was a consultant for Argonne National Laboratory and the Atomic Energy Commission (AEC). He was one of the assistant editors for the American Institute of Physics Handbook.

Cork was elected in 1928 a fellow of the American Physical Society and in 1940 a fellow of the American Association for the Advancement of Science.

He married Laurie Mae Kaufmann in 1918. They had two children.

Selected publications

Articles

Books
 
 
  2nd edition, 1950

References

1894 births
1957 deaths
20th-century American physicists
American nuclear physicists
University of Michigan alumni
University of Michigan faculty
Fellows of the American Association for the Advancement of Science
Fellows of the American Physical Society
People from St. Clair County, Michigan